Stylopoma is a genus of bryozoans belonging to the family Schizoporellidae.

The genus has almost cosmopolitan distribution.

Species:

Stylopoma amboyna 
Stylopoma aurantiacum 
Stylopoma carioca 
Stylopoma consobrina 
Stylopoma corallinum 
Stylopoma curvabile 
Stylopoma distorta 
Stylopoma duboisii 
Stylopoma faceluciae 
Stylopoma falcifera 
Stylopoma farleyensis 
Stylopoma fastigatum 
Stylopoma frater 
Stylopoma granulata 
Stylopoma hastata 
Stylopoma haywardi 
Stylopoma herodias 
Stylopoma horarium 
Stylopoma inchoans 
Stylopoma incomptum 
Stylopoma informata 
Stylopoma lacrima 
Stylopoma leverhulme 
Stylopoma magniporosa 
Stylopoma magnistilla 
Stylopoma magnovicellata 
Stylopoma mauritiana 
Stylopoma minutum 
Stylopoma multiavicularia 
Stylopoma novum 
Stylopoma palmula 
Stylopoma projecta 
Stylopoma robusta 
Stylopoma robusta 
Stylopoma rotundum 
Stylopoma schizostoma 
Stylopoma sinuata 
Stylopoma sloanei 
Stylopoma smitti 
Stylopoma spongites 
Stylopoma thornelyi 
Stylopoma timorensis 
Stylopoma variabilis 
Stylopoma varus 
Stylopoma velatum 
Stylopoma vilaensis 
Stylopoma viride 
Stylopoma warkhalensis

References

Bryozoan genera